Chang Tung-sheng may refer to:

Zhang Dongsun, Chinese philosopher
Chang Dongsheng, Chinese martial artist